The DHL Fastest Pit Stop Award is presented annually by the courier, Formula One global partner and logistics provider DHL "to recognize outstanding teamwork and performance from the ‘unsung heroes’ who make a critically important contribution to the drivers’ success on the track", and to award the team "that demonstrates the ability to work with speed and efficiency most consistently" over each event held over the course of the season.

Since , a points format based on the World Drivers' Championship and the World Constructors' Championships has determined the award's recipient through consistency. The constructor which records the fastest pit stop of a Grand Prix is awarded 25 points, with the second-quickest team getting 18 points, and the third-fastest squad attaining 15 points. The accolade presented to the winning constructor at an event that takes place at the final round of the season. The award is currently held by Red Bull Racing.

History

2015
Scuderia Ferrari won the inaugural DHL Fastest Pit Stop Award in 2015 with seven fastest pit stops, followed by Red Bull and Mercedes with four each. Ferrari posted the fastest pit stops in Malaysia, Bahrain, Spain, Monaco, Japan, Russia and Mexico. The fastest pit stop turnaround of 2.2 seconds was achieved at the race in the Spanish Grand Prix. The award ceremony took place at the season finale in Abu Dhabi.

2016
Williams set the pace of the award in 2016, by setting nine consecutive fastest pit stops to begin the season, with the fastest pit stop thus far set at 1.92 seconds at the 2016 European Grand Prix. Williams set 5 more fastest pit stops in Germany, Belgium, Malaysia, Japan and Mexico to secure the 2016 DHL Fastest Pit Stop Award.

2017
2017 saw the introduction of a new points system for the DHL Fastest Pit Stop Award. After the final race, Mercedes led the ranking with 472 points, ahead of previous winners Williams (442 points) and Red Bull (344 points), after setting the fastest pit stop in Spain, Belgium, Italy (1–2 finish), Singapore (1–2 finish), the United States and Mexico.

Winners

See also
 DHL Fastest Lap Award

References

External links
 Official website

Formula One
Auto racing trophies and awards
Fastest Pit Stop Award
2015 establishments in Europe
2015 establishments in Asia
2015 establishments in Africa
2015 establishments in North America
2015 establishments in South America
2015 establishments in Oceania